Living Ornaments '80 is a live album by British musician Gary Numan, first released in 1981. It was also issued as a limited edition box set with Living Ornaments '79 the same year. The original release was recorded at the Hammersmith Odeon on 16 September 1980, as a record of Numan's "Teletour" (September–November 1980).

An expanded and remastered version was reissued on a double CD in 2005. The tapes of the full concert from which the original album's ten tracks were culled have been lost, but in 2004 a mixing console recording of a complete song set from another (undated) UK concert was discovered and deemed to be of sufficient quality to release commercially. This set included, at that time, the only official live recordings of the tracks "Telekon", from the album of the same name, and "Stories", from Numan's then-forthcoming Dance album (1981). A live version of "Telekon" has since appeared on the Telekon – Live album (2008), recorded during Numan's Telekon Classic Album Tour of 2006, although no further live versions of "Stories" have been officially released.

Track listing
All songs written by Gary Numan.

Original version

Side one
"This Wreckage" – 5:20
"I Die: You Die" – 3:38
"M.E." – 4:27
"Everyday I Die" – 4:22
"Down in the Park" – 5:55

Side two
"Remind Me to Smile" – 3:40
"The Joy Circuit" – 5:47
"Tracks" – 2:43
"Are 'Friends' Electric?" – 5:30
"We Are Glass" – 4:32

Remastered version

Disc one
"This Wreckage"
"I Die: You Die"
"M.E."
"Everyday I Die"
"Down in the Park"
"Remind Me to Smile"
"The Joy Circuit"
"Tracks"
"Are 'Friends' Electric?"
"We Are Glass"
"This Wreckage"
"Remind Me to Smile"
"Complex"
"Telekon"

Disc two
"Me! I Disconnect From You"
"Cars"
"Conversation"
"Airlane"
"M.E."
"Everyday I Die"
"Remember I Was Vapour"
"Stories"
"Are 'Friends' Electric?"
"The Joy Circuit"
"I Die: You Die"
"I Dream of Wires"
"Down in the Park"
"Tracks"
"We Are Glass"

Tracks 1–10 on disc one comprise the original Living Ornaments '80 set. The rest of the tracks on disc one and all of the tracks on disc two comprise the recovered, undated show.
Film footage of the live version of "Down in the Park" from the original Living Ornaments '80 show was included in the music concert anthology film Urgh! A Music War (1981); the track was included on that film's accompanying soundtrack album, released in the same year.

Personnel
Gary Numan – vocals, guitar, synthesizer, producer, mixer
Roger Mason – keyboards
Cedric Sharpley – drums
Chris Payne – keyboards, viola
Paul Gardiner – bass
Russell Bell – guitar, keyboards, percussion
Tim Summerhayes – engineer
Phil Thornalley – assistant engineer
Will Gosling – assistant mixer

Charts
Original album #39 (UK Albums Chart)
Living Ornaments '79/'80 box set #2 (UK Albums Chart)

Notes

References
 
 LIVING ORNAMENTS 80 LP numanme.co.uk
Paul Goodwin (2004). Electric Pioneer: An Armchair Guide To Gary Numan

1981 live albums
Gary Numan live albums
Beggars Banquet Records live albums